The Cole Ranch AVA is an American Viticultural Area located in Mendocino County, California. At less than a quarter of a square mile, it is the smallest appellation in the United States. The AVA is located between the Russian River and Anderson Valley. All planted land in the appellation is owned by one party. Grapes are sold to several wineries. Cabernet Sauvignon, Merlot Pinot Noir and Riesling are the most popular planting. Cole Ranch is located within three larger appellations - Mendocino AVA, Mendocino County, and the North Coast AVA.

See also
Mendocino County wine

References

American Viticultural Areas
American Viticultural Areas of California
American Viticultural Areas of Mendocino County, California
1983 establishments in California